Noel Hill is a conspicuous slate knob, 255 m, on Barton Peninsula in the west part of King George Island, in the South Shetland Islands. The name was used by Scottish geologist David Ferguson in a 1921 report based upon his investigations of King George Island in 1913–14.

Hills of the South Shetland Islands
Landforms of King George Island (South Shetland Islands)